Ericka Peterson, known professionally as Wildgirl, is an artist and former WFMU DJ. Through the late 1980s and early-'90s, her Saturday night radio show, "Wildgirl's Rockin' Racing" (Saturdays from 6 to 9PM) and her "Wildgirl's Go-Go-Rama" live shows at the Coney Island Sideshow is credited with giving  birth to the go-go and burlesque revivals.

In the mid-1980s, she began making art under the trademarked name "Wildgirl" (Registration Number: 1,353,359), and in 1986 also assisted in the reopening of
the Coney Island sideshow, performing for a season as "Serpentina", snake handler and contortionist. In 1987 she produced the first "Wildgirl's Go-Go-Rama" show at the Sideshow by the Seashore.

In 1996, filmmakers Addison Cook and Annie Ballard produced Wildgirl's Go-Go-Rama, a documentary on the last Coney Island show, which won several awards, including best documentary at the Chicago Underground Film Festival.

References

American neo-burlesque performers
Women in New York City
20th-century American dancers
American radio DJs